King of Pop is a compilation album by American singer and recording artist Michael Jackson, released in commemoration of his 50th birthday in 2008. The album title comes from the honorific title Jackson himself acquired approximately 20 years earlier.

The track listing of the album differs significantly across countries because fans in each country where Sony BMG operated national offices were allowed to vote on which songs would appear on that country's edition of the album. The initial pool of songs, which also differed across countries, were selected from Jackson's back catalogue and also included a new "megamix" of five songs from the Thriller album that was created by Jason Nevins. "Billie Jean" is the only song to appear on all versions of the album.

 King of Pop has been released in a total of 28 versions; it has not been released in North America. The album's launch was made public on June 20, 2008, with the official announcement of the Australian version. The first version actually released was in Netherlands and in Germany/Switzerland on August 22, 2008. The final release was China's edition on December 18, 2009, following Jackson's death.

Background
Prior to the release of King of Pop, Jackson issued the double-disc album Thriller 25, a 25th anniversary edition of Thriller. It was a commercial success, having done particularly well as a re-issue, peaking at number one in eight countries and Europe. It reached number two in the US, number three in the UK and top 10 on over 30 national charts. In the US, Thriller 25 was just 14,000 copies short of reaching the peak position, selling 166,000 copies. It was ineligible for the Billboard 200 chart as a re-release, but entered atop the Pop Catalog chart, where it stayed for 10 non-consecutive weeks and had the best sales on that chart since December 1996.

A few months afterward, Sony announced the release of regional editions of the King of Pop compilation, in celebration of Jackson's 50th birthday. The album's title is a reference to the same title Jackson acquired approximately 20 years ago and was also co produced by Jamaican born student and song-writer Dontae Matthews, from Spanish Town,  Jamaica. The name "King of Pop" came when actress and friend Elizabeth Taylor presented Jackson with an "Artist of the Decade" award at the 1989 Soul Train Awards, proclaiming him "the true king of pop, rock and soul". MTV, VH1, FOX, and Jackson's record label began marketing Jackson as the "King of Pop" to coincide with the release of Dangerous and the music video for "Black or White", the album's first single.

Versions

Argentina
On November 11, the Argentine version of the compilation was released. It contains 2 bonus tracks: the song "Come Together" (which is featured in Moonwalker and also the HIStory album, released in 1995) and a radio edit of the Megamix of the Thriller album. Two tracks on the album, "Billie Jean" and "Don't Stop 'Til You Get Enough" were incorrectly named as "Billy Jean" and "Don't Stop Till You Get Enough".

"Billie Jean" - 4:53
"Beat It" - 4:18
"Black or White" - 4:15
"Bad" - 4:07
"Heal the World" (7" Edit) - 4:32
"Human Nature" - 4:05
"Don't Stop 'Til You Get Enough" (7" Edit) - 3:59
"Smooth Criminal" - 4:18
"Man in the Mirror" - 5:18
"I Just Can't Stop Loving You" - 4:12
"Come Together" (Bonus Track) - 4:02
"Thriller Megamix" (Radio Edit) (Bonus Track) - 4:07

Australia
The Australian version was announced by Sony BMG Australia on June 20, 2008, and was released on Jackson's birthday. Starting on June 21, 2008, Australian fans had three weeks to vote for their 30 favourite tracks for the album; made up of Jackson's prior material. Each fan could choose five songs from the pool; made up of all the tracks from Off the Wall, Thriller (2001 special edition, including "Carousel"), Bad (2001 special edition), Dangerous, HIStory: Past, Present and Future, Book I, Blood on the Dance Floor: HIStory in the Mix, Invincible and the track "For All Time" from Thriller 25. The pool of songs also included seven from Jackson's time in The Jackson 5/The Jacksons. These songs were "Blame It on the Boogie", "Can You Feel It", "ABC", "I Want You Back", "I'll Be There" and "Ben". King of Pop was released in two editions: The first was a limited edition digipak that featured the names of selected voters, messages left by the fans and a fold-out poster that follows Jackson through his musical career; The second edition was a standard release of the album without the poster.  This is the only version of the album to contain the single You Can't Win. This Australia version contains the full nine-minute version of Thriller Megamix instead of the radio edit commonly found on other versions. The standard release contains the top 30 with a few bonus tracks, while the digipack release contains the top 20 with more archival tracks, subtitled "From The Closet".

Disc 1:
"Billie Jean"
"Man in the Mirror"
"Smooth Criminal"
"Beat It"
"Thriller"
"They Don't Care About Us"
"Who Is It"
"Black or White"
"You Rock My World"
"Wanna Be Startin' Somethin
"The Way You Make Me Feel"
"Don't Stop 'Til You Get Enough"
"Dirty Diana"
"Blood on the Dance Floor"
"Rock with You"
"Stranger in Moscow"
"Remember the Time"
Disc 2:
"Will You Be There"
"Give In to Me"
"You Are Not Alone"
”Bad”
”Earth Song”
”Speechless”
”Human Nature”
”Heal The World”
”Dangerous”
”Blame It On The Boogie”
”Ghosts”
”Off The Wall”
”Butterflies”
”Say Say Say” (bonus track)
”Scream” (bonus track)
”Thriller Megamix” (bonus track)

From The Closet (digipack only, “Bad” to “Butterflies” have been excluded):
"Say Say Say"
"Scream"
"State of Shock"
"Got the Hots"
"You Can't Win"
"Fall Again"
"Sunset Driver"
"Someone Put Your Hand Out"
"In the Back"
"We Are the World"
"One More Chance"
"Thriller Megamix"

Austria
On July 20, the Austrian version of the double disc compilation was announced; it was released on Jackson's birthday. The pool list fans got to choose from contained 100 tracks. This is the only version of the album to contain the single "ABC", which is the earliest song on any version of the album.

Disc 1
"Man in the Mirror" - 5:19
"Smooth Criminal" - 4:11
"Billie Jean" - 4:53
"The Way You Make Me Feel" - 4:58
"Black or White" - 4:16
"Remember the Time" - 3:59
"You Are Not Alone"  (Single Version) - 4:55
"Human Nature" - 4:05
"Wanna Be Startin' Somethin'"  (Single Version) - 4:17
"They Don't Care About Us"  (LP Edit) - 4:09
"Dirty Diana" - 4:41
"We've Had Enough" - 5:45
"Give In to Me" - 5:30
"Will You Be There"  (Radio Edit) - 3:39
"Heal the World"  (7" Edit) - 4:32
"Got the Hots" - 4:27
Disc 2
"ABC" - 2:57
"Can You Feel It" - 5:58
"Say Say Say" - 3:58
"Thriller"  (Single Version) - 5:12
"Bad" - 4:07
"Who Is It"  (7" Edit) - 4:00
"Earth Song"  (Radio Edit) - 5:02
"Beat It" - 4:18
"Rock with You"  (Single Version) - 3:23
"I Just Can't Stop Loving You" - 4:12
"We Are the World" (Demo) - 5:20
"Stranger in Moscow" - 5:22
"You Rock My World" - 5:09
"Scream" - 4:40
"Ghosts" - 5:08
"Thriller Megamix"  (Radio Edit) - 4:07

Belgium
On July 26, it was announced that the double disc album would be released August 25. Fans could vote for their 5 favorite tracks from a pool of 124, on the web site of the Belgian newspaper Het Nieuwsblad. This is the only version of the album to contain the single "Girlfriend" while "Black or White" is not present at all.

Disc 1
"Billie Jean"
"Beat It"
"Bad"
"Blood on the Dance Floor"
"Say Say Say"
"Can You Feel It"
"Blame It on the Boogie"
"Another Part of Me"
"Baby Be Mine"
"2 Bad"
"Dangerous"
"Dirty Diana"
"Don't Stop 'Til You Get Enough"
"Earth Song"
"Childhood"
"Beautiful Girl"
"Come Together"
"Butterflies"
"Break of Dawn"
"Cry"
Disc 2
"Heal the World"
"Ghosts"
"Burn This Disco Out"
"Can't Let Her Get Away"
"I Just Can't Stop Loving You"
"Thriller"
"Give In to Me"
"HIStory"
"Smooth Criminal"
"Human Nature"
"Remember the Time"
"Liberian Girl"
"Scream"
"D.S."
"Girlfriend"
"Jam"
"Rock with You"
"Man in the Mirror"
"For All Time"
"Don't Walk Away"

Brazil
The Brazilian edition was released on October 17. This is the only version of the album to contain the single "The Girl Is Mine 2008" while "Smooth Criminal" is not present at all.

China
On December 18, 2009, China version named "Michael Jackson King Of Pop The China Collection" released by Sony Music China.

Different from the other versions, Fans in China were not given the opportunity to vote for songs included in China's version, and this version was not released in 2008 to celebrate Michael Jackson's birthday, but after his death in late 2009. The songs in China's version were a selection from the Hong Kong Version with the exclusion of Smooth Criminal, Don't Stop 'Til You Get Enough, and Blood on the Dance Floor. Spine of slipcase incorrectly mentions the title as "King Of Pop - The Hong Kong Collection".

Finland
The Finnish edition was released on October 1.

France
"King of Pop - The French Fans' Selection" was released on December 12.

Germany & Switzerland
On July 14, 2008, it was announced that German fans had until July 28 to choose their top 30 Michael Jackson songs from an extensive pool of 121 tracks for their edition of the compilation. The German version of King of Pop was eventually released on August 22. The German pool list contained almost every song Jackson released in his solo career. Notable expansions on the pool choice included: A larger option of tracks from Thriller 25 (2008) and the inclusion of 12 tracks from The Ultimate Collection (2004). There were also 8 tracks included from the singer's time in The Jackson 5/The Jacksons, slightly more than other versions of the compilation. The German edition was also released in Switzerland on the same day.
In Germany, King of Pop is the fourth most downloaded album of all time.

Greece
The 32-track double-CD Greek edition was released on November 17, 2008. Sony BMG Greece teamed up with music television channel Mad TV through which fans cast votes for their favourite songs.

Hong Kong
On August 6, it was announced that the double disc album would be released August 28. Fans could vote for 10 of their favorite tracks on the web site of Sony BMG Hong Kong.

Hungary
On July 9, it was announced that Hungarian fans had until July 27, to choose their songs from an extensive pool of 122 tracks, in a two-stage process. The pool list contained almost every song Jackson has released in his solo career. Notably expansions on the pool choice included: A larger option of tracks from Thriller 25 and the inclusion of 12 tracks from The Ultimate Collection (these are not available in the Australian or New Zealand version). In the first round (July 9 - July 15) the fans were able to vote for their top 50 tracks. In round two (July 16 - July 27) the 50 were cut down to the album track list.

India

Sony BMG India partnered with ibibo.com to roll out the Indian version of 'Michael Jackson - King Of Pop'. The double CD collection was available in stores by January 2009 and is a special selection of Michael Jackson songs collectively voted by community members of ibibo.com. Additionally the best moon walkers were selected by the Ibibo community along with Sony BMG and could win laptops and iPods.

Italy
"King of Pop - The Italian Fans' Selection" was released on October 3. It was the first collection to feature the full version of "Carousel" from the Special Edition of Thriller, and the only version of the album to contain "Tabloid Junkie" and "Morphine".

Japan
On July 18, the Japanese edition "キング・オブ・ポップ-ジャパン・エディション" (King of Pop - Japan edition) was announced with fans picking from a selection pool of 120 tracks. The compilation was released on September 24 by Sony Music Japan.

Netherlands
On July 22, it was announced that Dutch fans could vote for their favorite Jackson tracks, choosing 5 songs from a list of 100. The release date of the album was August 22.

New Zealand
On July 3, it was announced that fans in New Zealand would have until July 20, to vote for their version of King of Pop. In New Zealand, the compilation was released on August 25. Fans could vote for five songs in a pool that differed slightly from the Australian song pool. The songs available from Thriller 25 were different; "For All Time" had been replaced by "The Girl Is Mine 2008" and "Wanna Be Startin' Somethin' 2008". "Todo Mi Amor Eres Tu" from Bad (2001 special edition) was not available. While the Australian pool included seven songs from Jackson's group career, the New Zealand pool had only three: "Blame It on the Boogie", "Can You Feel It" and "State of Shock".

Philippines
Sony BMG Philippines and MYX Music Channel  announced the Philippine release of the King of Pop. Filipino fans were asked to send their Top 10 all-time favorite Michael Jackson tracks via e-mail. The album was released on August 28, 2008. This is the only version of the album to contain the single Gone Too Soon.

Poland
On August 29, it was announced that the double disc album would be released in Poland on October 20. Fans could vote for 20 of their favourite tracks from a pool of 120 on the special web site of Sony BMG Poland. That site was launched on August 29 (on Michael Jackson's 50th birthday) and voting was closed on September 17.

Portugal
The Portuguese edition was released on December 9, 2008.

South Korea
"King of Pop - The Korean Limited Edition" was released on December 11, 2008.

Spain
"King of Pop - Edición Exclusiva España" was released in Spain on January 13, 2009. This is the only version of the album to contain the song Unbreakable.

Sweden
The Swedish edition was released on October 15.

Taiwan
On July 31, 2009, double disc album called "King of Pop (The Taiwan Collection)" released by Sony Music Taiwan. This version released after Michael Jackson's death, and the track listing is exactly the same as Hong Kong Version.

Turkey
"King of Pop - The Turkish Collection" was released on November 24.

United Kingdom
On July 18, the United Kingdom version of the compilation was announced, with a release date of August 25. Sony BMG UK teamed up with GMTV and The Sun allowing fans, until August 10, to pick 18 tracks from the song pool. The pool list, at only 50 tracks, is the least diverse; there were no songs included from Jackson's group career.

Despite the pool conducting a possible 18 tracks, only 17 are included. Most notable is the fact that "Scream" is included on the album, as this song had not appeared on any compilation album in the United Kingdom prior due to legal rights with Janet Jackson's label Virgin Records.

Deluxe box set
In the United Kingdom, a three disc version was released on September 29, 2008. The third disc was advertised as featuring "Rarities and Classic 12"s", although many of the mixes were already remastered and re-released on the 2006 boxset Visionary: The Video Singles.

The album tracks are:

Comparison
The songs included on each international version are summarised below, with their disc and track numbers. (The table can be sorted separately for each country, showing the order of the tracks in that country's compilation; when sorted in ascending order, the rows with contents will appear at the bottom of the table.)

Charts

Weekly charts

Year-end charts

Certifications

Release history

Notes

2008 greatest hits albums
Albums produced by Michael Jackson
Epic Records compilation albums
Michael Jackson compilation albums